Paepke, Päpke is a surname. Notable people with the surname include:

 Dennis Paepke (born 1946), American baseball player
 Jack Paepke (1922–2014), American baseball player, manager, and scout

See also
 Paepcke